World Perspectives is a scholarly book series edited by Ruth Nanda Anshen and published by Harper & Row.

Number indicates order in series.

Approaches to God by Jacques Maritain	
Accent on Form by Lancelot Law Whyte	
Scope of Total Architecture by Walter Gropius
Recovery of Faith by Sarvepalli Radhakrishnan	
World Indivisible, With Liberty and Justice for All by Konrad Adenauerv
Society and Knowledge by Vere Gordon Childe
The Transformations of Man by Lewis Mumford
Man and Materialism by Fred Hoyle
The Art of Loving by Erich Fromm	
Dynamics of Faith by Paul Tillich
Matter, Mind and Man: The Biology of Human Nature by Edmund W. Sinnott
Mysticism: Christian and Buddhist by D. T. Suzuki
Man's Western Quest by Denis de Rougemont	
American Humanism by Howard Mumford Jones
The Meeting of Love and Knowledge: Perennial Wisdom by Martin D'Arcy
Rich Lands and Poor by Gunnar Myrdal	
Hinduism: Its Meaning for the Liberation of the Spirit by Swami Nikhilananda
Can People Learn to Learn? by Brock Chisholm
Physics and Philosophy by Werner Heisenberg
Art and Reality: ways of the creative process by Joyce Cary	
Sigmund Freud's Mission: An Analysis of His Personality and Influence by Erich Fromm
Mirage of Health: Utopias, Progress & Biological Change by René J. Dubos
Issues of Freedom: Paradoxes and Promises by Herbert J. Muller	
Humanism: The Greek ideal and its survival (Harper Colophon books) by Moses Hadas
Life, Its Dimensions and Its Bounds by Robert M. MacIver	
Challenge of Psychical Research: A Primer of Parapsychology by Gardner Murphy
Alfred North Whitehead; his reflections on man and nature by Ruth Nanda Anshen
The Age of Nationalism: The First Era of Global History by Hans Kohn	
Voices of Man by Mario Andrew Pei	
New Paths in Biology by Adolf Portmann	
Myth and Reality by Mircea Eliade
History as Art and as Science: Twin Vistas on the Past by H. Stuart Hughes	
Realism in Our Time by György Lukács
The Meaning of the Twentieth Century: The Great Transition by Kenneth E. Boulding
On Economic Knowledge by Adolph Lowe	
Caliban Reborn: Renewal in Twentieth-century Music by Wilfrid Howard Mellers
Through the Vanishing Point: Space in Poetry and Painting by Marshall McLuhan
The Revolution of Hope: Toward a Humanized Technology. by Erich Fromm
Emergency Exit by Ignazio Silone
Marxism and the Existentialists by Raymond Aron
Physical Control of the Mind by José Manuel Rodriguez Delgado
Physics and Beyond by Werner Heisenberg
On Caring by Milton Mayeroff
Deschooling Society by Ivan Illich
Revolution Through Peace by Dom Helder Camara
Man Unfolding by Jonas Salk
Tools for Conviviality by Ivan Illich
Across the Frontier by Werner Heisenberg
Evil and World Order by William Irwin Thompson
To Have or to Be? by Erich Fromm
Energy and Equity by Ivan Illich
Letters From the Field, 1925-1975 by Margaret Mead
In the Centre of Immensities by Bernard Lovell
Hope and History, an Exploration by Morton Smith

External links
World Perspectives Series

Series of books